Crotedumab (REGN1193) (INN) is a humanized monoclonal antibody designed for the treatment of diabetes.

This drug was developed by Regeneron Pharmaceuticals.

References 

Monoclonal antibodies